This is a list of television shows that are broadcast on the Indian pay television channel Star Bharat.

Current broadcasts

Former broadcasts

Comedy series

Drama series

Mythological series

Reality series

Acquired series

See also
List of programs broadcast by Life OK
List of programs broadcast by Star Plus

References

 
S
S
Disney Star